Ipimorpha contusa is a moth belonging to the family Noctuidae. The species was first described by Christian Friedrich Freyer in 1849.

It is native to Eurasia.

References

Caradrinini